Michael Au Ding Yuk (born 6 November 1957) is a Hong Kong music producer.Michael is Hakka people and his parents originate from Guangdong province, mainland China.  He is well known for his collaboration with Hong Kong singer Jacky Cheung and Priscilla Chan.

Michael started as a music engineer with PolyGram, and eventually participated in the work of record producer.

References 

1957 births
Hong Kong record producers
Living people
Place of birth missing (living people)
Hong Kong people of Hakka descent